Funso Aiyejina (born 1949) is a Nigerian poet, short story writer, playwright and academic. He is the former Dean of Humanities and Education (until his retirement in 2014) and current Professor Emeritus at the University of the West Indies. His collection of short fiction, The Legend of the Rockhills and Other Stories, won the 2000 Commonwealth Writers' Prize, Best First Book (Africa).

Biography

Funso Aiyejina was born in 1949 in Ososo, Edo State, Nigeria. He is not Yoruba as most people think. He graduated from the University of Ife (now Obafemi Awolowo University) in Nigeria, Acadia University, Wolfville, Nova Scotia, in Canada, and the University of the West Indies, St Augustine, Trinidad.
He taught for more than a decade at Obafemi Awolowo University, and since 1990 at the University of the West Indies in Trinidad & Tobago. In 1995–96, he was Fulbright Lecturer in Creative Writing at Lincoln University in Jefferson City, Missouri. He is Deputy Festival Director of the NGC Bocas Lit Fest.

Writing 
Aiyejina's poetry and short stories have been published in many international journals and  anthologies including The Anchor Book of African Stories, Literature Without Borders, Kiss and Quarrel: Yoruba/English - Strategies for Mediation, The New African Poetry, and The Penguin Book of Modern African Poetry (1999), in which 1999 publication he was described as "one of Nigeria's finest satirists". His stories and plays have been read and dramatized on the radio in Nigeria and England.

He won the Association of Nigerian Authors' Poetry Prize in 1989 for his first book of poetry, A Letter to Lynda and Other Poems (1988). His first book of fiction, The Legend of the Rockhills and Other Stories (1999), won Best First Book (Africa), Commonwealth Writers' Prize, 2000. Reviewing his 2004 poetry collection, I, The Supreme and Other Poems, Jennifer Rahim stated: "All of Aiyejina's books to date demonstrate a concentrated interest with the historical, cultural and political life of Africa, particularly his native Nigeria. What is also evident is an emerging engagement with the continent's expanded diaspora. His writing, in other words, manifests a blossoming black diasporic poetics.... As outsider/insider to the Caribbean landscape and culture, he is awed by the miracle of African cultural survival and transformation."

He is a widely published critic on African and West Indian literature and culture. He is particularly notable for his work on the writing of Earl Lovelace, having been the editor of A Place in the World: Essays and Tributes in Honour of Earl Lovelace @ 70 (2008) and of Earl Lovelace: Growing in the Dark (Selected Essays) (2003), as well as author of the 2017 biography Earl Lovelace (University of the West Indies Press). Aiyejina is also the editor of Self-Portrait: Interviews with Ten West Indian Writers and Two Critics (2003) and co-editor (with Paula Morgan) of Caribbean Literature in a Global Context (2006). His play The Character Who Walked Out On His Author has been performed in Trinidad and Tobago, Jamaica and Nigeria.

Works

Poetry

A Letter to Lynda and Other Poems, Saros International Publishers, 1988 (Association of Nigerian Authors Prize, 1989); Lightning Source Inc, 2006, 
I, The Supreme and Other Poems, Kraft Books Limited, 2004, 

The Errors of the Rendering, Peepal Tree Press Ltd, 2020

Short stories

The Legend of the Rockhills and other stories, TSAR, 1999,

Plays

The Character Who Walked Out On His Author, Kraft Books Limited, 2020, ISBN 978-918-604-4

As editor

A Place in the World: Essays and Tributes in Honour of Earl Lovelace, Lexicon Trinidad Ltd, 2008, 
Earl Lovelace: Growing in the Dark (Selected Essays), Lexicon Trinidad Ltd, 2003, 
Self-Portrait: Interviews with Ten West Indian Writers and Two Critics, University of the West Indies, 2003, 
Thicker Than Water (New Writing from the Caribbean), Peekash Press, 2018, 
"Sport Matters - Views from the UWI Faculty of Sport, 2019–2020", University of the West Indies Press, 2021,

As co-editor
 (With Judy Stone) Moving Right Along: Caribbean Stories in Honour of John Cropper, Lexicon Trinidad Ltd, 2010, 
 (With Paula Morgan) Caribbean Literature in a Global Context, Lexicon Trinidad Ltd, 2006,

Biography
Earl Lovelace (Caribbean Biography Series), University of the West Indies Press, 2017,

Monograph
"Esu Elegbara: A Source of an Alter/Native Theory of African Literature and Criticism", Centre for Black and African Arts and Civilization, 2010,

References

External links
Funso Aiyejina, "Esu Elegbara: A Source of an Alter/Native Theory of African Literature and Criticism"
Interface: Anson Gonzalez In Conversation with Funso Aiyejina, 1998.
HK Baptist University International Writers Workshop - OutLoud Readings.

Nigerian male poets
Living people
People from Edo State
University of the West Indies academics
Obafemi Awolowo University alumni
University of the West Indies alumni
Acadia University alumni
Academic staff of Obafemi Awolowo University
1949 births
20th-century Nigerian poets
21st-century Nigerian poets
Yoruba poets
Yoruba academics
Nigerian expatriate academics in the United States
Lincoln University (Missouri) faculty
English-language writers from Nigeria
Nigerian expatriates in Trinidad and Tobago
Nigerian dramatists and playwrights
20th-century short story writers
Nigerian short story writers
20th-century male writers
21st-century male writers